Gopikishan Bajoria is a Shiv Sena politician from Akola district, Maharashtra. He is current Member of Legislative Council as a member of Shiv Sena representing Akola-cum-Washim-cum-Buldhana Local Authorities constituency. He has been elected to Maharashtra Legislative Council for three consecutive terms for 2004, 2010 and 2016.

He got elected to legislative council for the third consecutive time with a record margin of 274 votes, securing 513 of the total 791 votes. During his tenure as a legislator he has achieved a special grant for Shioni airport, Akola and successfully raised funds from the state government. Apart from this, he is largely associated with the social work.
Gopikisan Bajoria has played a key role in development of cottage industries and small scale village industries for the employment and betterment of low earning farmers of Akot, Telhara and Hiwarkhed.

Positions held
 2004: Elected to Maharashtra Legislative Council (1st term)
 2010: Re-elected to Maharashtra Legislative Council (2nd term)
 2016: Re-elected to Maharashtra Legislative Council (3rd term)

References

External links
 Shivsena website 

Living people
Shiv Sena politicians
People from Akola district
Members of the Maharashtra Legislative Council
Marathi politicians
Year of birth missing (living people)